MV Koolinda was an Australian general cargo and passenger ship which operated as a coastal steamer off Western Australia from 1930 to 1959.

General description

Koolinda was built in 1926 by Harland and Wolff of Glasgow, Scotland for the State Shipping Service, and was registered at Fremantle.

Koolinda was used mostly for passenger and general freight transport on coastal routes in Western Australian waters.

In May 1932, Koolinda famously narrowly missed seeing two German aviators lost on the Kimberley coastline.  The men were eventually found close to death.

In the aftermath of the battle between HMAS Sydney and German auxiliary cruiser Kormoran in November 1941, the Koolinda recovered German sailors from a 31-man lifeboat and returned them to Carnarvon.

Koolinda is sometimes confused with another State Ships vessel of a similar design, Koolama.

References

1929 ships
Ships built on the River Clyde
Economic history of Western Australia
World War II merchant ships of Australia
Maritime history of Australia
Kimberley (Western Australia)